This is a list of museums in Lebanon.

Ethnographic Museum of the University of Balamand

Cilicia Museum

Armenian Genocide Orphans'"Aram Bezikian" Museum
 Ameen Rihani Museum
 Archaeological Museum of the American University of Beirut
 Baalbek
 Banque Du Liban Museum
 Beit Beirut
 Beiteddine Palace Museum
 Bsous Silk Museum
 Byblos Fossil Museum
 Byblos Wax Museum
 Château Ksara
 Citadel of Raymond de Saint-Gilles
 Gibran Museum
 Lebanese Heritage Museum
 Lebanese Marine and Wildlife Museum 
 Lebanese Military Museum
 Mim Museum
 Moussa Castle
 Modern And Contemporary Art Museum
 Museum of Lebanese Prehistory
 Nabu Museum
 National Museum of Beirut
 Robert Mouawad Private Museum
 Saint George Greek Orthodox Cathedral Archaeological Crypt Museum
 Sidon Soap Museum
 Sursock Museum
 Tourist Landmark of the Resistance

See also

 Tourism in Lebanon
 History of Lebanon
 Culture of Lebanon
 List of museums
 Archaeology of Lebanon

Museums

Lebanon
Museums
Museums
Lebanon